=Lysergic acid methyl ester is an analogue of lysergic acid diethylamide (LSD). It is a member of the tryptamine family and is extremely uncommon.  It acts on the 5-HT receptors in the brain, as do most tryptamines.

References

External links
 Preparation of lysergic acid esters
 Process for the preparation of lysergic acid esters - Patent 4524208

Ergot alkaloids
Carboxylate esters
Methyl esters